The Hallmuir Ukrainian Chapel is a chapel built at Hallmuir prisoner of war camp near Lockerbie in Scotland. After the Second World War, this camp housed Ukrainian soldiers from the Galician Division of the Waffen SS. The soldiers built the  chapel from converted army huts. It  was listed in 2003 as a Category B building.

The chapel became a site for collected donations to help Ukrainians affected by the Russian invasion that began in February 2022.

References

External links
Hallmuir Ukrainian Chapel at Canmore

Category B listed buildings in Dumfries and Galloway